Mount Allen Young is a prominent pyramidal mountain, 2,755 m, standing just south of Fegley Glacier and west of Lennox-King Glacier in the Holland Range. Discovered by the British Antarctic Expedition (1907–09) and named for Sir Allen Young, polar explorer who led the successful search for Benjamin Leigh Smith in the Arctic in 1882.

Mountains of the Ross Dependency
Shackleton Coast